Thanks for the Ether is the debut studio album of American rock band Rasputina, released on August 6, 1996, on Columbia Records. The album was recorded at Sear Sound Recording Studio in New York City, and produced by Jimmy Boyle and Melora Creager. The cover art and packaging was designed by Creager. The album did not chart in any country and it did not sell many copies. It contains an eclectic collection of songs and spoken-word narration. It is also known for introducing the band's pioneering use of distortion effects pedals on their cellos, single-handedly launching the underground genre known as cello rock.

On October 1, 1996, the band appeared as the musical guest on Late Night with Conan O'Brien to promote the album. 

In 1998, the track "Transylvanian Concubine" was featured in the season 2 episode of Buffy The Vampire Slayer, "Surprise".

Reception
In a review for AllMusic, Vincent Jefferies called the album "a rare accomplishment", saying "If only more mope rockers, shoegazers, death metalers, and other dour stylists could be so clever, their music would become many times more listenable," and "Rasputina paint a completely new gothic landscape on this debut, and fans of the genre or anything dark and artful simply must own it." In a review for CMJ, Douglas Wolk praised the band's "sly humor and self-awareness", and said of the album, "Thanks For The Ether has a couple of conceptual misfires, but even the lesser stuff is pleasingly unlike anything else: they err on the side of adventurousness, which is always a good idea."

Track listing

Personnel
 Melora Creager – Cello, vocals, producer, art direction
 Julia Kent – Cello
 Carpella Parvo – Cello
 Norm Block – Drums
 Jimmy Boyle – Producer
 Michael Brauer – Mixing
 Greg Calbi – Mastering
 Greg Gordon – Engineer
 Dave Shiffman – Engineer

References

1996 debut albums
Rasputina (band) albums
Columbia Records albums